is Japanese rock band Gesu no Kiwami Otome's second studio album, released on January 13, 2016.

Promotion and release 
"Romance ga Ariamaru" was used as the theme song for the 2015 science action film Strayer's Chronicle.

Track listing 
All tracks were written and composed by vocalist Enon Kawatani.

Charts

Sales and certifications

Release history

References 

2016 albums
Japanese-language albums
Unborde albums
Warner Music Japan albums